The Madrigal Society is a British association of amateur musicians, whose purpose is to sing madrigals. It may be the oldest club of its kind in existence in England. It was founded by the copyist John Immyns. Sir John Hawkins was an early member of the club and, in his General History of the Science and Practice of Music of 1776, gives the date of its foundation as 1741; the earliest documentary evidence dates from 1744.

In April 1940, due to The Blitz on London, the Society suspended its regular meetings, but resumed them in 1946, after the end of the Second World War.

References

Further reading 

 Thomas Oliphant (1835). [https://books.google.com/books?id=ivXJVrg0YagC A Brief Account of the Madrigal Society, from Its Institution in 1741 up to the Present Period]. London: Calkin & Budd.
 [s.n.] (1845). Brief Chronicle of the Last Month. The Musical Times and Singing Class Circular, 1 (10): 79.
 Vernon Opheim (1977). The English Romantic Madrigal. DMA dissertation, University of Illinois, 1971.
 Percy M. Young (1977). The Madrigal in the Romantic Era. New York: American Choral Review.  Journal of the American Choral Foundation, Inc. 4: 35–61.
 Percy Lovell (1979). “Ancient” Music in Eighteenth-Century England. Music & Letters 60: 401–415.
 Suzanne Cole (2008). Thomas Tallis and his Music in Victorian England. Woodbridge: Boydell & Brewer. 
 James Hobson (2012). Three Madrigal Societies in Nineteenth-Century England. In: Paul Rodmell (editor) (2012). Music and Institutions in Nineteenth-Century Britain. Aldershot: Ashgate. Pages 33–55.
  (2015). Musical Antiquarianism and the Madrigal Revival in England, 1726–1851 (PhD thesis). Bristol: University of Bristol. .

Madrigals
Music organisations based in the United Kingdom